Sergio Santos may refer to:
Sergio Santos (baseball) (born 1983), American baseball player
Sérgio Santos (volleyball) (born 1975), also known as Serginho or Escadinha, Brazilian volleyball player
Sergio Santos (footballer, born 1994), Brazilian football forward for FC Cincinnati
Sérgio Santos (footballer, born 1998), Portuguese football forward for Portimonense
Sergio Santos (footballer, born 2001), Spanish football right-back for Real Madrid

See also
Sergio Dos Santos (born 1950), South African soccer player